Catane is a commune in Dolj County, Oltenia, Romania with a population of 2,010 people. It is composed of two villages, Catane and Catanele Noi. These were part of Negoi Commune until 2004, when they were split off.

References

Communes in Dolj County
Localities in Oltenia